Agnes Kunihira is a member of the Parliament of Uganda, representing workers. She belongs to the ruling National Resistance Movement party.

Background 
She was born on the 14 July 1966.

Education 
Below is her detailed education background:

Career 
Here is her career history:

Additional role 
Agnes serves on additional role at the Parliament of Uganda as the Committee on East African Community Affairs.

See also 

 List of members of the tenth Parliament of Uganda
 Parliament of Uganda

External links 

 Website of the Parliament of Uganda

References 

Living people
Members of the Parliament of Uganda
Women members of the Parliament of Uganda
1966 births